Mokelumne Hill (Mokelumne, Miwok for "People of the Fish Net") is a census-designated place (CDP) in Calaveras County, California, United States. The population was 646 at the 2010 census, down from 774 at the 2000 census. It is commonly referred to as "Moke Hill" by locals. The town takes its name from the neighboring Mokelumne River, which in turn is Miwok for the "people of Mokel," the likely name of a Native American village in the area.

History

Mokelumne Hill was one of the richest gold mining towns in California. Founded in 1848 by a group of Oregonians, the placers were so rich that the miners risked starvation rather than head to Stockton to replenish their supplies (one finally did and made it rich by becoming a merchant).

By 1850 the town was one of the largest in the area. Its population reached as high as 15,000 with people of all nationalities, particularly Americans, Frenchmen, Germans, Spaniards, Chileans, Mexicans, and Chinese. Besides racial tensions, the easy gold attracted criminal elements, and the town gained a reputation as one of the bawdiest in the area. Notorious bandit Joaquin Murrieta is said to have been a frequent visitor to the gambling venues. Violence was a major problem as well. In 1851, there was at least one homicide a week for seventeen consecutive weeks.

A June, 1851, incident in Mokelumne Hill has been dubbed California's French Revolution, or French War, by some historians.  The previous year the State Legislature had passed the Foreign Miners' Tax Act of 1850. Frenchmen in the area revolted and refused to pay the tax. The Sheriff, also the Tax Collector, summoned a large posse to enforce the act, but the Frenchmen raised the French flag and proclaimed their independence. This prompted the Governor to direct a battalion of militia, commanded by William D. Bradshaw, to suppress the revolt. Disaster was averted when Bradshaw negotiated with the Frenchmen to stand down.

Also in 1851, the first post office was established in the town, and in 1852 the town became the county seat. In the same year a vigilance committee was formed and the worst of the crime was eliminated.

By the 1860s the gold started to run out and the town's population and importance diminished. When San Andreas became the new county seat in 1866, Mokelumne Hill's status declined even further. The town today is a quiet place, with much tourism due to its historic status. From 1959–1977 Mokelumne Hill was home to Lucile S. Davidson, known as "the shoe lady of Mokelumne Hill". She was in The Stockton 'Record' and later in the Guinness Book of World Records for having the largest privately owned glass shoe collection in the world.

Mokelumne Hill is registered as California Historical Landmark #269.

Landmarks
The I.O.O.F. Hall (CHL #256) is said to be California's first three-story building to be erected outside the coastal towns.
The Congregational Church building (CHL #261) is the oldest such in the state.
The Hotel Léger (CHL #663) is one of the oldest continuously-operating hotels in California. One of its buildings was the county courthouse when the town was the county seat.
The Baldwin Hotel located at 8399 Center Street (corner of Center and Clark) was first built back in 1854, by John Rapetto and his partner John Rogers. Since then it has housed several businesses including Raggio's Stone House up until around 1876, the Baldwin Hotel originally operated by Louis Baldwin, and the Gardella Mortuary, which was located in the basement of the building. When Charles (Carlo) Gardella purchased the property, taking over the Baldwin Hotel, he used his skills as a carpenter to make several additions to the structure, including the veranda and the gable-end gingerbread woodwork which was very popular in Victorian design at the time. Charles Gardella immigrated from Italy to the United States in 1861. He eventually settled in Mokelumne Hill, and Calaveras County Marriage Records note that he married Lenora Cataldo on November 11, 1875. The 1880 Census has him living in Moke Hill, and working as a wagon maker 
The original elementary school in Mokelumne Hill, which is still standing but has been converted to a private residence, was built in 1852 and was used until 1964. Unconfirmed legend has it that a bond issue to build the school failed, but citizens of the town built it anyway.
 The basement of the Hotel Léger was the first meeting place of E Clampus Vitus.
Gardella House (1930s). (8258 Church Street). A Designated Historic Building by the Mokelumne Hill Community Historical Trust. This Spanish Eclectic/Mission Revival style was constructed in the 1930s by John Gardella. The industrial metal sash windows are original to the design and the home has been beautifully maintained. John Gardella, son of Charles (Carlo) Gardella, was the Calaveras County Coroner from the mid 1930s to mid 1950s

Geography
According to the United States Census Bureau, the CDP has a total area of 3.1 square miles (8.0 km), over 99% of it land.

Climate
According to the Köppen Climate Classification system, Mokelumne Hill has a hot-summer Mediterranean climate, abbreviated "Csa" on climate maps.

Demographics

At the 2010 census Mokelumne Hill had a population of 646. The racial makeup of Mokelumne Hill was 571 (88.4%) White, 3 (0.5%) African American, 12 (1.9%) Native American, 4 (0.6%) Asian, 0 (0.0%) Pacific Islander, 26 (4.0%) from other races, and 30 (4.6%) from two or more races. Hispanic or Latino of any race were 66 people (10.2%).

The whole population lived in households, no one lived in non-institutionalized group quarters and no one was institutionalized.

There were 299 households, 63 (21.1%) had children under the age of 18 living in them, 129 (43.1%) were opposite-sex married couples living together, 31 (10.4%) had a female householder with no spouse present, 14 (4.7%) had a male householder with no spouse present. There were 24 (8.0%) unmarried opposite-sex partnerships, and 5 (1.7%) same-sex married couples or partnerships. 99 households (33.1%) were one person and 38 (12.7%) had someone living alone who was 65 or older. The average household size was 2.16. There were 174 families (58.2% of households); the average family size was 2.71.

The age distribution was 102 people (15.8%) under the age of 18, 39 people (6.0%) aged 18 to 24, 119 people (18.4%) aged 25 to 44, 245 people (37.9%) aged 45 to 64, and 141 people (21.8%) who were 65 or older. The median age was 51.4 years. For every 100 females, there were 88.9 males. For every 100 females age 18 and over, there were 84.4 males.

There were 354 housing units at an average density of ,of which 299 were occupied, 205 (68.6%) by the owners and 94 (31.4%) by renters. The homeowner vacancy rate was 2.8%; the rental vacancy rate was 18.3%. 447 people (69.2% of the population) lived in owner-occupied housing units and 199 people (30.8%) lived in rental housing units.

Politics

References

External links

Edith Irvine Collection includes photographs of Mokelumne Hill

Census-designated places in Calaveras County, California
California Historical Landmarks
Former county seats in California
Census-designated places in California